The 1992 Alaska Milkmen season was the seventh season of the franchise in the Philippine Basketball Association (PBA).

Draft picks

Notable dates
February 11: Alaska Milk with former Presto import Winston Crite on his third stint in the league and now playing for the Airmen going up against the new-look Ginebras with returning import Jervis Cole in a highly-anticipated first game between the two teams, Alaska prevailed, 127-122, over the defending first conference champions.  

March 17: Alaska pulled off a 121-111 overtime triumph over Ginebra San Miguel that sent them a game closer to the semifinal round with their fifth win in 10 games while the Gins bowed out of contention with their seventh loss against three wins. 

March 29: Alex Araneta lifted Alaska to a 97-96 come-from-behind win over Presto Ice Cream at the start of the semifinal round of the First Conference. Araneta knocked in a medium-range jumper over the outstretched arms of Abe King to cap a sterling night for the Airmen, which won for the third straight time while the Ice Cream Kings absorbed their third straight setback. 

June 7: Paul Alvarez knocked in a layup with three seconds left to cap his heroics for the Airmen in a 101-99 win over Seven-Up in the opening game of the All-Filipino Conference. 

September 20: Sean Chambers returns anew and went up for the first time against former best import awardee Jamie Waller of Ginebra, who was coming back after four years, in the main game of the Third Conference opening double-header. The Airmen nip Ginebra, 93-92, on Bobby Jose's two free throws with one second left. 

October 15: Alaska coasted to a 115-102 triumph over erstwhile unbeaten Swift. The Airmen dealt the Mighty Meaties their first loss after six straight wins as they held down prolific import Tony Harris to his conference low 38 points after making history five days earlier in Iloilo City by scoring a record-breaking 105 points.

Roster

Transactions

Trades

Rookie free agent

Recruited imports

References

Alaska Aces (PBA) seasons
Alaska